Nisha Ganesh is an Indian film and television actress who has appeared in Tamil films and serials. After making her breakthrough portraying Draupadi in the TV series Mahabharatham and hosting shows such as Surya Vanakkam on Sun TV, she has gone on to appear in supporting roles in feature films.

Career
Nisha started her acting as a college student in Vijay TV's Kana Kannum Kalangal Kalloriyin Kadhai and later appeared in Saravanan Meenatchi as Thenmozhi. Nisha Krishnan made her breakthrough portraying Draupadi in the TV series Mahabharatham and subsequently went on to host shows such as Surya Vanakkam, Kitchen Galatta and Sun Singer (Season- 2)  and appeared in the TV series Deivamagal as Ragini on Sun TV.

As a media student, she was actively involved in short film-making during her education and collaborated with them when making the films Bench Talkies - The First Bench (2015) and Chennai Ungalai Anbudan Varaverkirathu (2015). She has also gone on to appear in supporting roles in feature films, notably portraying roles in Ivan Veramathiri (2013) and Naan Sigappu Manithan (2014).

Personal life
Nisha Krishnan got engaged to actor Ganesh Venkatraman in February 2015, and the pair got married on 22 November 2015.In June 2019 she gave birth to their first child Samaira.

Filmography

Television 
Serials

Shows

References

Tamil television actresses
Actresses in Tamil television
Indian film actresses
Tamil actresses
Living people
Indian VJs (media personalities)
Actresses from Chennai
Year of birth missing (living people)